is a Japanese photography critic, historian of photography, and magazine editor.  Born in Sendai, Miyagi in 1954, Iizawa studied photography in Nihon University, graduating in 1977. He obtained his doctorate at University of Tsukuba.  Iizawa founded Déjà-vu in 1990 and was its editor in chief until 1994. He coedited the 41-volume series Nihon no Shashinka with Shigeichi Nagano and Naoyuki Kinoshita.

Books by Iizawa

"Geijutsu shashin" to sono jidai. Tokyo: Chikuma Shobō, 1986. . 
Nūdo shashin no mikata. Tokyo: Shinchōsha, 1987. . 
Shashin ni kaere. Tokyo: Heibonsha, 1988. . 
Toshi no shisen. Osaka: Sōgensha, 1989. . 
Toshi no shisen: Nihon no shashin 1920–30 nendai. Tokyo: Heibonsha, 2005. .  Expanded edition.
Shashin no chikara. Tokyo: Hakusuisha, 1989. . 
Shashin no mori no pikunikku. Tokyo:, 1991. . 
Shashin to fetishizumu / La photographie et le fetichisme. Tokyo: Treville, 1992. . 
Nihon-shashinshi o aruku. Tokyo: Shinchōsha, 1992. . 
Sengo shashinshi nōto. Tokyo: Chūōkōronsha, 1993. . 
Shashin no genzai: Kuronikuru 1983–1992 (The photograph today: Chronicle 1983–1992). Tokyo: Miraisha, 1993. . 
Araki!. Tokyo: Hakusuisha, 1994. .  About Nobuyoshi Araki.
Tōkyō shashin. Tokyo: Inax, 1995. . 
Shashin bijutsukan e yōkoso. Tokyo: Kōdansha, 1996. . 
Fotogurafāzu. Tokyo: Sakuhinsha, 1996. . 
Shattā ando ravu / Shutter and Love: Girls are dancin' on in Tokyo. Tokyo: Infasu, 1996. . 
Shashin to gurotesuku / La photographie et le grotesque. Tokyo: Treville, 1996. . 
Shashinshū no tanoshimi. Tokyo: Asahi Shinbunsha, 1998. . 
Dōjidai shashin: クロニクル1993–1997 (Contemporary photographs: A chronicle, 1993–1997). Tokyo: Miraisha, 1999. . 
Wareta kagami-tachi no kuni de: Nihon no seikimatsu shashin / In the Country of Broken Mirrors: Japanese Contemporary Photographers. Tokyo: Mainichi Shinbunsha, 1999. . 
(joint author) Nihon shashin-shi gaisetsu (An outline history of photography in Japan). Tokyo: Iwanami, 1999. . 
Shi-shashinron. Tokyo: Chikuma Shobō, 2000. . 
Shashin no kuni no Arisu. Tokyo: Fukuinkan Shoten, 2001. 
Afurika okurimono. Tokyo: Fukuinkan Shoten, 2001. . 
Aruku kinoko. Tokyo: Suiseisha, 2001. . 
Shōjo ko-shashinkan. Tokyo: Chikuma Shobō, 2001. . 
"Shashin jidai" no jidai!. Tokyo: Hakusuisha, 2002. . 
Boku no kage o sagashite. Tokyo: Fukuinkan Shoten, 2003. 
Shashin to kotoba: Shashinka nijūgonin. Tokyo: Shūeisha, 2003. . 
Shashin hyōronka. Tokyo: Madosha, 2003. . 
(joint author) The History of Japanese Photography, ed. Ann Wilkes Tucker, et al. New Haven: Yale University Press, 2003. . 
Dejigurafi: Dejitaru wa shashin o korosu ka?. Tokyo: Chūōkōronsha, 2004. . 
Me kara me e: Shashinten o aruku 2001-2003. Tokyo: Misuzu Shobō, 2004. . 
Shashin ni tsuite hanasō. Tokyo: Kadokawa Gakugei Shuppan, 2004. . 
Sekai shashinshi / The Concise History of World Photograph. Tokyo: Bijutsu Shuppansha, 2004. . 
Japanīzu fotogurafāzu: 14-nin no shashinka-tachi no "ima". Tokyo: Hakusuisha, 2005. . 
Abunai shashinshū 246. Tokyo: Studio Parabolica, 2005. . 
Araki-bon! 1970–2005 (Araki books! 1970–2005). Tokyo: Bijutsu Shuppansha, 2006. .  A descriptive bibliography of the books of Nobuyoshi Araki.
Fotogurafā ni naru no wa. Tokyo: Naruniwa Books, 2007. . 
Sekai no kinoko kitte / Around the World with a Mushroom Stamp. Tokyo: Puchigurapa Publishing, 2007. . 
Shashin o tanoshimu. Tokyo: Iwanami Shoten, 2007. . 
(edited) Nihon no shashinka 101 (101 Japanese photographers). Tokyo: Shinshokan, 2008. .

Notes

External links
"Shashin hyōronka Iizawa Kōtarō: Shashin to kotoba" (Kohtaro Iizawa, photo critic: Photography and language). Bunka kaigi.  A wide-ranging interview with Iizawa.

1954 births
Living people
Japanese writers
Photography critics
Photography in Japan
People from Sendai
Japanese magazine editors
Nihon University alumni
University of Tsukuba alumni
Historians of photography